"Honeycomb" and "Gotham" are two tracks released on a double A-side single in advance of Animal Collective's ninth studio album, Centipede Hz. It was announced via the band's official website and was made available for free streaming on May 6, 2012. The physical single was put up for presale on Domino's online store, with an MP3 download being available simultaneously. Neither of the songs were released on Centipede Hz. The single has also been referred to as Centipede Hz's EP, or accompanying songs, as they were outtakes from the Centipede Hz recording sessions; this is supported by the fact that the 3 EPs predating Honeycomb/Gotham consisted mainly of outtake material that didn't make it on their accompanying LPs.

Track listing

References

2012 singles
Animal Collective songs
Domino Recording Company singles
2012 songs